Schleifer is a German-language surname. Its Polonized form is Szlajfer, Russified of Yiddish: Shleifer.

Notable people with this surname include.
 
 Abdallah Schleifer v S. Abdallah Schleifer (b. Marc Schleifer, 1935), prominent Middle East expert 
 James T. Schleifer a.k.a. James Thomas Schleifer, American historian
 Meyer Schleifer (1908–1994), American bridge player

Schleifer is also the German term for Slide (musical ornament)

German-language surnames